"Briciole" (Italian for "crumbs") is the first single by Noemi from the EP Noemi.

The song
"Briciole" is a song written by Diego Calvetti, Marco Ciappelli and Francesco Sighieri and produced by Diego Calvetti. It got the gold disc.

Track listing
Digital download

Music video
The music video for "Briciole" was filmed in Verona; it was produced by Gaetano Morbioli.

Charts

Year-end charts

References

2009 singles
Noemi (singer) songs
Songs written by Diego Calvetti
Songs written by Marco Ciappelli
Soul songs
Italian-language songs
2009 songs